Pay it forward is an expression for describing the beneficiary of a good deed repaying the kindness to others instead of to the original benefactor.

The concept is old, but the particular phrase may have been coined by Lily Hardy Hammond in her 1916 book In the Garden of Delight. Robert Heinlein's 1951 novel Between Planets helped popularize the phrase.

"Pay it forward" is implemented in contract law of loans in the concept of third party beneficiaries. Specifically, the creditor offers the debtor the option of paying the debt forward by lending it to a third person instead of paying it back to the original creditor. This contract may include the provision that the debtor may repay the debt in kind, lending the same amount to a similarly disadvantaged party once they have the means, and under the same conditions. Debt and payments can be monetary or by good deeds. A related type of transaction, which starts with a gift instead of a loan, is alternative giving.

History 
Paying forward was used as a key plot element in the denouement of a New Comedy play by Menander, Dyskolos (the title can be translated as "The Grouch"), a prizewinning play in ancient Athens in 317 BC.

The oldest, and perhaps most basic pattern of this concept, is the inter-generational devotion of parents to their children, re-enacting what their own parents did for them. In her 1916 book In the Garden of Delight, Lily Hardy Hammond reflects, "I never repaid Great-aunt Letitia's love to her, any more than she repaid her mother's. You don't pay love back; you pay it forward."

American author and former war correspondent Richard Harding Davis, had already published a popular short story in The Metropolitan Magazine (dated March, 1914) entitled "The Boy Scout," that also dealt directly with the same concept.  In it, a young "Scout" does a "good deed" that eventually reverberates world-wide. 

Regarding money, the concept was described by Benjamin Franklin, in a letter to Benjamin Webb dated April 25, 1784:

In Ecclesiastes 11:1, it is written: Cast your bread upon the waters, for you will find it after many days. 

Jesus taught in Matthew 18:21–35, that paying it forward is a requirement for those who have received God's forgiveness. He told a parable of a man who had been forgiven a huge debt by the king, because the debtor had begged for mercy. However, after being freed from the debt, he found a fellow who owed him a very small debt, by comparison. Although he had been shown a great mercy, he refused the same consideration to his fellow who had pled for more time to pay. When the king found this out, he was angry, and threw the original debtor into prison until he paid the entire debt. Jesus summarized the story by saying, "So likewise shall my heavenly Father do also unto you, if ye from your hearts forgive not every one his brother their trespasses."

Ralph Waldo Emerson, in his 1841 essay "Compensation", wrote: "In the order of nature we cannot render benefits to those from whom we receive them, or only seldom. But the benefit we receive must be rendered again, line for line, deed for deed, cent for cent, to somebody." Woody Hayes (1913 – 1987), winner of five national titles as football coach at Ohio State University, misquoted Emerson as having said "You can pay back only seldom. You can always pay forward, and you must pay line for line, deed for deed, and cent for cent." He also shortened the (mis)quotation into "You can never pay back; but you can always pay forward" and variants.

The 1929 novel, Magnificent Obsession, by Lloyd C. Douglas, also espoused this philosophy, in combination with the concept that good deeds should be performed in confidence.

An anonymous spokesman for Alcoholics Anonymous said in The Christian Science Monitor in 1944, "You can't pay anyone back for what has happened to you, so you try to find someone you can pay forward."

Also in 1944, the first steps were taken in the development of what became the Heifer Project, one of whose core strategies is "Passing on the Gift".

In Robert Heinlein's 1951 novel Between Planets, the circumstances of war place the protagonist in a country where it is illegal to spend his foreign money. He is hungry and a stranger gives him enough to pay for lunch:

The mathematician Paul Erdős heard about a promising math student unable to enroll in Harvard University for financial reasons. Erdős contributed enough to allow the young man to register. Years later, the man offered to return the entire amount to Erdős, but Erdős insisted that the man rather find another student in his situation, and give the money to him.

It is also possible for the original beneficiary to become part of the later chain of kindness. Some time in 1980, a sixteen-page supplemental Marvel comic appeared in the Chicago Tribune entitled “What Price a Life?” and was subsequently reprinted as the backup story in Marvel Team-Up #126 dated February 1983. This was a team-up between Spider-Man and The Incredible Hulk, in which Spider-Man helps the Hulk escape from police who mistakenly thought that he was attacking them. Afterwards, they meet in their secret identities, with Peter Parker warning Bruce Banner to leave town because of the Hulk’s seeming attack on police. But Banner is flat broke, and cannot afford even bus fare. As a result, Parker gives Banner his last $5 bill, saying that someone had given him money when he was down on his luck, and this was how he was repaying that debt. Later, in Chicago, the Hulk confronts muggers who had just robbed an elderly retired man of his pension money, all the money he had. After corralling the muggers, the Hulk turns towards the victim. The retiree thinks that the Hulk is about to attack him as well, but instead, the Hulk gives him the $5 bill. It transpires that the very same old man had earlier given a down-on-his-luck Peter Parker a $5 bill.

1999 novel, film and subsequent projects 
In 1999, Catherine Ryan Hyde's novel Pay It Forward was published and then adapted in 2000 into a film of the same name, distributed by Warner Bros. and starring Kevin Spacey, Helen Hunt and Haley Joel Osment. In Ryan Hyde's book and movie, it is described as an obligation to do three good deeds for others in response to a good deed that one receives. Such good deeds should accomplish things that the other person cannot accomplish on their own. In this way, the practice of helping one another can spread geometrically through society, at a ratio of three to one, creating a social movement with an impact of making the world a better place.

The Pay it Forward Movement and Foundation was founded in the USA helping start a ripple effect of kindness acts around the world. The newly appointed president of the foundation, Charley Johnson, had an idea for encouraging kindness acts by having a Pay it Forward Bracelet that could be worn as a reminder. Since then, over a million Pay it Forward bracelets have been distributed in over 100 countries sparking acts of kindness. Few bracelets remain with their original recipients, however, as they circulate in the spirit of the reciprocal or generalized altruism.

In 2007, International Pay It Forward Day was founded in Australia by Blake Beattie. It has now spread to 70 countries with over 50 state and city proclamations. It is estimated that it has inspired over five million acts of kindness and has featured on 7, 9, 10, ABC, NBC, Fox 5, Fox 8 and Global News in Canada.

On April 5, 2012, WBRZ-TV, the American Broadcasting Company affiliate for the city of Baton Rouge, Louisiana, did a story on The Newton Project, a 501(c)(3) outreach organization created to demonstrate that regardless of how big the problems of the world may seem, each person can make a difference simply by taking the time to show love, appreciation and kindness to the people around them. It is based on the classic pay-it-forward concept, but demonstrates the impact of each act on the world by tracking each wristband with a unique ID number and quantifying the lives each has touched. The Newton Project’s attempt to quantify the benefits of a Pay It Forward type system can be viewed by the general public at their website.

Economic model

Several firms have adopted the pay it forward approach as an economic model. These include Karma Kitchen, where patrons' meals have already been paid for by previous customers, and customers are then encouraged to contribute toward future patrons' meals. Heifer Project International pioneered the approach in sustainable development, and it has been utilized by microfinance lenders. Some authors advocate the pay it forward approach be utilized as the primary means of economic transaction.

Experiments and Explanations

Several experiments document that individuals pay forward in the sense that they pass on a behavior that they have experienced.
Individuals who are given more money are, for example, more likely to donate to a stranger.
Individuals who are assigned easy tasks are more like to assign someone else to an easy tasks. Finally, drivers who experience that others are insisting on their right of way are more likely to insist on their right of way.

Two explanations for the observed paying-it-forward have been considered. Evolutionary biologists and psychologists argue that being helped or harmed leads to an emotional reaction such as gratitude or anger, which in turn trigger the respective behavior. 
 Being given an annoying task renders an individual angry and this is why she assigns an annoying task to the next person. Alternatively, individuals may learn from their experience what seems to be appropriate behavior (social learning theory). Being given an annoying task indicates to the individual that this assignment is 
adequate in this context. This then leads the individual to assign the annoying task to the next person.

Schnedler (2020) finds that individuals no longer pay forward if behavior cannot be directly imitated. This suggests that at least in the experiments so far paying forward is driven by social learning rather than emotions.

See also

 Feed the Deed
 Random act of kindness
 Reciprocity (social psychology)
 Reciprocity (cultural anthropology)
 Six degrees of separation
 Social business
 Social responsibility
 Suspended coffee
 Gift economy
 Cool To Be Kind

References

External links
 Pay it Forward Day UK
 International Pay it Forward Day
 Pay It Forward Life
 Pay It Forward movie

Giving
1784 introductions
Sociological terminology